The 2017 season for the  cycling team began in January.

2017 roster

Riders who joined the team for the 2017 season

Riders who left the team during or after the 2016 season

Season overview

One-day races

Spring classics

Fall races

Stage races

Grand Tours

Giro d'Italia

Tour de France

Vuelta a España

Season victories

National, Continental and World champions 2017

Footnotes

References

External links
 

Bora-Hansgrohe
Bora–Hansgrohe
2017 in German sport